Woolnough is a surname. Notable people with the surname include:

Adam Woolnough (born 1981), Australian professional rugby league player
Brian Woolnough (1948–2012), British sports journalist
Don Woolnough (1920–2003), Australian bowls player
Drew Woolnough, bassist in the band FVK
Frank Woolnough (1845–1930) Museum curator
George Woolnough, saddler in Tenterfield, New South Wales from 1908 until his retirement in 1960
Hilda Woolnough (1934–2007), world-renowned artist with shows in Europe, Asia, the Caribbean and North America
James K. Woolnough (1910–1996), United States Army four-star general
Jeff Woolnough, film and television director, with an active career beginning in the late 1980s
Marc Woolnough (born 1980), former Australian rules footballer
Michael Woolnough (born 1952), former Australian rules footballer
Walter George Woolnough (1876–1958), Australian geologist
 Peter Allen (born Peter Richard Woolnough; 10 February 1944 – 18 June 1992) was an Australian singer-songwriter, musician and entertainer

See also
Mount Woolnough, mountain over 1,400 m, standing on the north side of Mackay Glacier, about midway between Mount Morrison and Mount Gran in Victoria Land